Nicholas Paul (born March 20, 1995) is a Canadian professional ice hockey left winger for the Tampa Bay Lightning of the National Hockey League (NHL). A left winger, he was selected by the Dallas Stars in the fourth round, 101st overall, of the 2013 NHL Entry Draft.

Early life
Paul was born on March 20, 1995, in Mississauga, Ontario, to parents Ellwood and Melinda. He holds dual citizenship between Canada and the United States due to his mother being an American citizen. Growing up, his father and half brother Christopher built a backyard rink for Paul and his older brother Jesse to use for practice. As a youth, Paul was friends with Max Domi and attended Toronto Maple Leafs games with him.

Playing career

Junior
While growing up in Mississauga, Paul played minor midget hockey for the Mississauga Chargers of the Greater Toronto Hockey League (GTHL). During his 2011–12 season with the Chargers, Paul scored three goals and two assists for five points. While standing at only 5-foot-6 during his Ontario Hockey League (OHL) draft eligibility year, Paul tallied four goals and 25 points in 37 games. Despite failing to be drafted into the OHL in his first year of eligibility, Paul was later selected by the Brampton Battalion, (later the North Bay Battalion) as an overaged player. After his first season with the Battalion, where he scored 12 goals and 28 points, Paul was selected 101st overall by the Dallas Stars in the 2013 NHL Entry Draft.

Following the draft, Paul returned to the Battalion and continued his scoring prowess. By October 14, Paul led the team with five goals in eleven games. This continued throughout the season as he accumulated 37 goals and 29 assists through 58 regular-season games under coach Stan Butler. As such, he helped lead the team to the OHL's Eastern Conference Finals against the Oshawa Generals. Throughout the post-season, Paul maintained a four-game goal scoring streak and was tied for second in goal scoring with nine through 15 games. Following the playoffs, Paul's NHL rights were traded by the Stars on July 1, 2014, along with Alex Chiasson, Alex Guptill, and a 2015 second-round pick, to the Ottawa Senators in exchange for Jason Spezza and Ludwig Karlsson.

Paul re-joined the Battalion for his final season in the OHL during the 2014–15 season. By December, he had accumulated 19 goals and 34 points through 27 regular-season games and subsequently signed a three-year entry-level contract with the Senators on December 20, 2014. Upon joining the Senators for their 2015 development camp, he measured at 6-4 and 225 pounds.

Professional

Ottawa Senators
Paul signed with Ottawa and made his professional debut with their American Hockey League (AHL) affiliate, the Binghamton Senators in the 2014–15 season. He finished with six goals and 11 assists in 45 games with Binghamton. Paul was assigned to Binghamton by Ottawa for the 2015–16 season also. Paul was called up in February 2016 and made his NHL debut on February 16, 2016, against the Buffalo Sabres. He recorded his first career NHL goal on February 24, 2016, in a 4–1 win over the Edmonton Oilers.

On July 16, 2018, Paul signed a one-year contract with the Senators. On July 2, 2019, Paul re-signed with the Senators for another season.

Tampa Bay Lightning
On March 20, 2022, just a day before the trade deadline, Paul was traded by Ottawa to the Tampa Bay Lightning in exchange for Mathieu Joseph and a 2024 fourth-round draft pick.

In the seventh game of the Lightning's first-round playoff series against the Toronto Maple Leafs, Paul scored his first two playoff goals, including the series-winner. Paul helped the Lightning advance to the Stanley Cup Finals for their third successive season and contributed with 5 goals and 9 points through 23 games before falling to the Colorado Avalanche.

On July 1, 2022, Paul opted to forgo free-agency in agreeing to a seven-year, $22.05 million contract extension to remain with the Lightning.

International play

As a Canadian citizen, Paul has represented his home country at the junior and senior levels on two occasions. His first tournament with the Canadian men's national junior ice hockey team was during the 2015 World Junior Ice Hockey Championships. He finished the tournament with three goals in seven games to help Canada win a gold medal.

Paul was chosen to represent Canada again at the senior level for the 2021 IIHF World Championship. Paul scored at 6:26 of the first overtime in the gold medal game against Finland to give Canada its 21st all-time gold medal.

Career statistics

Regular season and playoffs

International

References

External links

1995 births
Belleville Senators players
Binghamton Senators players
Brampton Battalion players
Canadian ice hockey left wingers
Dallas Stars draft picks
Ice hockey people from Ontario
Living people
North Bay Battalion players
Ottawa Senators players
Sportspeople from Mississauga
Tampa Bay Lightning players